Denton is a city in Jeff Davis County, Georgia, United States. The population was 250 at the 2010 census.

History
The Georgia General Assembly incorporated the place in 1911 as the "Town of Denton". The community most likely was named after Samuel Denton, an early settler.

Geography

Denton is located at  (31.722663, -82.696323).

Demographics

As of the census of 2000, there were 269 people, 96 households, and 69 families residing in the city. The racial makeup of the city was 73.98% White, 18.59% African American, 6.69% from other races, and 0.74% from two or more races. Hispanic or Latino of any race were 6.69% of the population.

There were 96 households, out of which 29.2% had children under the age of 18 living with them, 55.2% were married couples living together, 13.5% had a female householder with no husband present, and 28.1% were non-families. 27.1% of all households were made up of individuals, and 7.3% had someone living alone who was 65 years of age or older.  The average household size was 2.80 and the average family size was 3.38.

In the city, the population was spread out, with 30.5% under the age of 18, 8.9% from 18 to 24, 27.9% from 25 to 44, 22.3% from 45 to 64, and 10.4% who were 65 years of age or older.  The median age was 33 years. For every 100 females, there were 92.1 males.  For every 100 females age 18 and over, there were 94.8 males.

The median income for a household in the city was $20,833, and the median income for a family was $27,250. Males had a median income of $19,000 versus $20,313 for females. The per capita income for the city was $7,649.  About 28.3% of families and 24.1% of the population were below the poverty line, including 13.1% of those under the age of eighteen and 41.7% of those 65 or over.

References

Cities in Georgia (U.S. state)
Cities in Jeff Davis County, Georgia